Ivari Ilja (born May 3, 1959 in Tallinn) is an Estonian pianist trained at the Moscow Conservatory under Vera Gornostayeva and Sergei Dorensky best known for his work as an accompanist. He is the rector of the Estonian Academy of Music and Theatre.

References

External links
Biography 

Living people
Estonian classical pianists
Tallinn Music High School alumni
1959 births
Estonian Academy of Music and Theatre alumni
Moscow Conservatory alumni
Academic staff of the Estonian Academy of Music and Theatre
Musicians from Tallinn
20th-century Estonian musicians
21st-century Estonian musicians
21st-century classical pianists
Recipients of the Order of the White Star, 4th Class